Carlos Retiz (born November 5, 1968) is a retired long-distance runner from Mexico. He represented his native country at the 1988 Summer Olympics in Seoul, South Korea, where he finished in 50th place in the men's marathon, clocking a total time of 2:25:34.

Achievements

References
sports-reference

1968 births
Living people
Mexican male long-distance runners
Olympic athletes of Mexico
Athletes (track and field) at the 1988 Summer Olympics
Place of birth missing (living people)
20th-century Mexican people